Bachia pallidiceps, Cope's bachia, is a species of lizard in the family Gymnophthalmidae. It is found in  Costa Rica, Colombia, and Panama.

References

Bachia
Reptiles described in 1862
Taxa named by Edward Drinker Cope